Leuculodes is a genus of moths of the Doidae family.

Species
Leuculodes lacteolaria Hulst, 1896
Leuculodes lephassa Druce, 1897

Former species
Leuculodes dianaria Dyar, 1914

References 

Doidae
Ditrysia genera
Moth genera